Port MacDonnell, originally known as Ngaranga is the southernmost town in South Australia. The 2016 Australian census which was conducted in August 2016 reports that the locality of Port MacDonnell had a population of 847 of which 671 lived in its town centre. Once a busy shipping port, the town now relies heavily on its fishing and summer tourism industries, particularly rock lobster harvest industry, proclaiming itself "Australia's Southern Rock Lobster Capital".

History 

The area was originally inhabited by the Bungandidj Aboriginal people, who referred to it as Ngaranga, possibly meaning "noisy" or "caves". Their oral history recorded that the dry land previously extended southwards from this area, before it was flooded.

In 1860 the area was proclaimed an official port, was given a name, and was surveyed. It is named after Sir Richard Graves MacDonnell who was Governor of South Australia from 1855 to 1862.

In the 1880s, it was one of Australia's busiest ports, shipping large quantities of wheat and wool to Europe.

The port was, however, exposed to the weather and the site of many shipwrecks. Across the border in Portland, Victoria, 85 km southeast, is a much more sheltered port.

The following have been listed as state heritage places on the South Australian Heritage Register – the Cape Northumberland Lighthouse, the Dingley Dell Museum and the Former Port MacDonnell customs house.

Geography 

The town of Port MacDonnell is set on flat swampy land in a bay between rocky capes of spectacular wave eroded formations the most spectacular being those to the near west at Cape Northumberland.  The port's harbour itself is formed by a large artificially constructed rock breakwater, while the coastline is sandy beaches and rock outcrops providing shelter to the port from the rough seas.  The rock provides substantial habitat for the southern rock lobster which is the town's main industry and colonies of little penguin.

Lighthouse 

Cape Northumberland has a prominent lighthouse which dates to 1882.  
An earlier 1858 lighthouse was the first in South Australia however was demolished after it was in danger of collapse.   A monument marks the site.

Governance 
Port MacDonnell is located within the federal division of Barker, the state electoral district of Mount Gambier and the local government area of the District Council of Grant.

See also
Dingley Dell Conservation Park

References

Coastal towns in South Australia
Limestone Coast
1860 establishments in Australia